Sebastián Lelio Watt (born 8 March 1974) is a Chilean director, screenwriter, editor and producer. He received critical acclaim for directing the films Gloria (2013) and A Fantastic Woman (2017), the latter of which won an Academy Award for Best Foreign Language Film.

Early life
Lelio was born in Mendoza, Argentina and moved to Viña del Mar, Chile at the age of 2 with his Chilean mother Valeria. He describes his early life as "nomadic": "Up to the age of 21, I was moving between different cities in Chile. I lived for a time in the United States, and also in Viña del Mar; my maternal family is from Viña...essentially I was never more than two or three years in the same city."

After some years in Viña, his mother moved to Concepción; later, they lived for one year in North America; from the age of 12 to 17, he lived in Cholguán (Yungay, Chile).

Born with the surname Lelio, he changed his surname to that of his adoptive father Campos, but after having attained some fame with his first film, Lelio again took his biological father's name.

Career
After studying journalism for one year at Andrés Bello University, Lelio graduated from the Chilean Film School (Escuela de Cine de Chile). He has directed many short films and musical videos. In 2003, he released Cero, a documentary based on unedited material from the 2001 September 11 attacks in New York, co-directing with Carlos Fuentes. He directed two seasons of the successful documentary series Mi mundo privado (My private life) together with Fernando Lavanderos. The series followed the private lives of Chilean families from diverse socioeconomic backgrounds and was nominated twice for the Altazor Awards and also the Emmy Awards.

In 2005, his debut feature film La Sagrada Familia (The Sacred Family) premiered at the San Sebastián International Film Festival. Filmed over three days and edited over a period of almost one year, the film screened in over one hundred festivals and received a number of national and international awards. In 2009, his second feature film, Navidad (Christmas), premiered at the Cannes Film Festival.

The Year of the Tiger (Spanish: El Año del Tigre), Lelio's third feature film, premiered at the Locarno International Film Festival in 2011. The film is set in the aftermath of the 2010 Chile earthquake and follows an escaped prisoner as he journeys through areas hit hardest by the quake.

As with his first two films, The Year of the Tiger explores religious faith and how it influences people's behaviours. Lelio told an interviewer from The Clinic (magazine), "What I find fascinating is the interplay between the question of meaning that religion poses - a basic question - with the fact that in Chile, in Latin America, the Judeo-Christian version of reality is dominant. Everything is defined in relation to this view: whether you are for or against it, whether or not you escape it."

Lelio's fourth feature film, Gloria, won the San Sebastián International Film Festival Film in Progress award in 2012. The film premiered at the Berlin International Film Festival in 2013, to excellent reviews, with lead actress Paulina García receiving the festival's prestigious Best Actress award.

In his fictional work, Lelio favours the use of digital cinematography. Using improvisation, montage work, and scripts without dialogue, he created the short films Ciudad de maravillas, Carga vital, and 2 minutos.

Lelio has been awarded the Guggenheim Fellowship and a German DAAD grant to develop his new projects. As a scriptwriter, Lelio has written or co-written all of his films (including short films), except The Year of the Tiger.

In 2018, A Fantastic Woman won the Oscar for Best Foreign Film, making it the first Chilean film to win that honor.

The Chilean Lelio's Oscar success was reported by the Argentinian press as the "Argentinian Director who won the Oscar". In an interview with Clarín in February 2018, he stated: "I was born in Argentina but technically I am not Argentinian, I am Chilean. My biological father is Argentinian but I was raised in Chile. I have a relationship with him and Argentina, place where I go often but in strict sense I am not Argentinian."

Filmography

Feature-length films
 La sagrada familia, 2006
 Christmas, 2009
 The Year of the Tiger, 2011
 Gloria, 2013
 A Fantastic Woman, 2017
 Disobedience, 2017
 Gloria Bell, 2018
The Wonder, 2022

Short films
 4, 1995
 Cuatro, 1996
 Smog, with Marialy Rivas, 2000
 Fragmentos urbanos, 2002
 Ciudad de maravillas, 2002
 Carga vital, 2003
 El efecto Kulechov, 2010
 Algoritmo, 2020

References

External links
 
 

1974 births
Living people
20th-century Argentine writers
20th-century Chilean writers
20th-century Chilean male writers

21st-century Argentine writers
21st-century Argentine male writers
21st-century Chilean writers
21st-century Chilean male writers

Argentine emigrants to Chile
Argentine expatriates in Chile
Argentine film directors
Argentine film editors
Argentine film producers
Argentine screenwriters
Chilean film directors
Chilean film editors
Chilean film producers
Chilean people of Argentine descent
Argentine people of Chilean descent
Naturalized citizens of Chile
Chilean screenwriters
Male screenwriters
Directors of Best Foreign Language Film Academy Award winners
People from Mendoza, Argentina
Silver Bear for Best Screenplay winners